Peppa Pig is a British preschool animated television series by Astley Baker Davies. The show follows Peppa, an anthropomorphic female piglet, and her family, as well as her peers portrayed as other animals. The show first aired on 31 May 2004. The seventh season began broadcasting on 5 March 2021. Peppa Pig has been broadcast in over 180 countries.

Peppa herself has been voiced by several different performers through the years. Lily Snowden-Fine provided her voice in season one and Cecily Bloom in season two, then Harley Bird, five years old when she started, acquired the role for thirteen years until stepping down after season six. The role was taken over by Amelie Bea Smith. John Sparkes, Morwenna Banks, Richard Ridings, Oliver May and Alice May also provide voices.

On 31 December 2019, Hasbro acquired Entertainment One, including the Peppa Pig franchise, for a US$3.8 billion deal. On 16 March 2021, it was announced that the series was renewed until 2027, with the original creators and studio (Astley Baker Davies) replaced by Karrot Animation (producers of Sarah & Duck).

On 17 November 2022, Hasbro announced that they would be selling Entertainment One, however the Peppa Pig franchise would remain with Hasbro.

Background
Taking place in a world where almost all characters are animals, Peppa Pig revolves around the titular character and her family and friends. Each episode is approximately five minutes long. Each of her friends is a different species of animal. Peppa's friends are her age, and Peppa's younger brother George's friends are his age. Episodes tend to feature everyday activities such as attending playgroup, going swimming, visits with their grandparents, cousins, and friends, going to the playground or riding their bikes.

The characters wear clothes, live in houses, and drive cars, but still display some characteristics of the animals on which they are based. Peppa and her family snort like pigs during conversations in which they are speaking English, and the other animals make their respective noises when they talk, with some exhibiting other characteristics, such as the Rabbit family's squeaking sounds and enjoyment of carrots. The Rabbit and Mole families are the exceptions to the rule of human-like habitation, as they live in a burrow in a hill, though it has windows and is furnished in the same way as the other houses. The characters blush when embarrassed, and their mouths express other emotions such as sadness, happiness, irritation, bewilderment, and confusion. Although the main characters—mostly mammals—are anthropomorphic, other animal characters are not, such as Tiddles the tortoise, Polly Parrot, and the ducks. The narrator of the series, John Sparkes, reinforces the action and humour, saying things like "Oh, dear" when something unfortunate happens (such as when George starts crying) or "Look out!" when a character is doing something unsafe (such as Peppa riding her bicycle without looking where she is going).

Production and airing
In the United Kingdom, the first series of 52 five-minute episodes began on Channel 5 on 31 May 2004. The second series of 52 episodes began on Channel 5 on 4 September 2006, with Cecily Bloom replacing Lily Snowden-Fine as Peppa, among other cast changes. The third series started telecasting on Channel 5's preschool-targeted block Milkshake! on 4 May 2009 with Harley Bird replacing Cecily Bloom and Lily Snowden-Fine as Peppa.

In the United States, the series first aired as part of Cartoon Network's Tickle-U preschool programming block from 22 August 2005 to 2007. For these airings, the show was redubbed with American actors. However, there were no other official releases of this dub, and every US airing since 2008 uses the original British soundtrack. In 2008, Peppa Pig moved to the Noggin channel in the US. It was aired as part of Noggin Presents, a series of interstitial shorts aired in between full shows. Since February 2011, the series airs as a half-hour show on the Nick Jr. US channel, and on the separate Nick Jr. block on Nickelodeon as of November 2013. For each episode, 5 segments are put together (though for the special containing "Golden Boots" and the episode containing "Around the World", only 3 segments are used) to make the run time 25 minutes. As of June 2021, there were 9 seasons (and 1 standalone special) of Peppa Pig in the US.

Peppa Pig is animated using CelAction.

Characters

Episodes and DVD releases

Other media

Books
There is a series of books based on Peppa Pig, one of which, Peppa Meets the Queen, was written to coincide with the Queen's Diamond Jubilee.

Films
A 15-minute film called Peppa Pig: The Golden Boots was released on 14 February 2015 alongside several episodes of the TV series. As of December 2015, it had grossed £2,326,328. 

A second film, branded a "cinema experience", was released on 16 March 2017, and was shown in cinemas on 7 April 2017. It features nine exclusive new episodes, four of which share the same theme, Peppa's holiday in Australia. Between the episodes are segments with a live-action host named Daisy (played by Emma Grace Arends) and Peppa and George as hand-made puppets, based on the Peppa Pig Live stage show.

Theme parks

Peppa Pig World
Peppa Pig World, a themed area based on the series, opened on 9 April 2011 at Paultons Park, New Forest, Hampshire, England, with attractions such as nine rides, an indoor play zone, a muddy puddles water splash park, children-sized play areas and themed buildings.

Peppa Pig World of Play
On October 17, 2017, Merlin Entertainments announced a partnership with Entertainment One to become the exclusive licensor for theme park attractions based on the show worldwide except in the United Kingdom and in China, which will be a non-exclusive partnership.

The deal began with the announcement of Peppa Pig World of Play on June 5, 2018, which are indoor play areas with unique twists. The first venue to open would be in Shanghai for a Late-2018 opening, and opened in Late-October. Additional venues in Beijing, as well as two US venues in Dallas-Fort Worth and Michigan were also announced around this time for a 2019 opening. The Dallas-Fort Worth venue opened in February 2019. while the Michigan venue opened later on in the year.

In September 2021, a Peppa Pig World of Play venue was announced to open in the Netherlands.

Peppa Pig Theme Park
Peppa Pig Theme Park is a separately-ticketed park located within the Legoland Florida Resort; it opened on February 24, 2022.

Peppa Pig Resort
On June 23, 2021, Merlin announced a dedicated Peppa Pig-themed resort located in Sichuan, China, opening in 2024. It will contain a theme park, a hotel and a Sea Life aquarium. Construction began in July 2021.

Merchandise
Peppa Pig, the Entertainment One (eOne) brand, grossed over £200 million in UK merchandise sales in 2010, doubling the 2009 figure of £100 million. According to NPD figures for 2010, Peppa Pig had become the number one pre-school property in the total toy market, moving up four places from its 2009 position.  Peppa Pig was stated to have over 1,000 licensees worldwide, and 80 in the US, up from 63 licensees in 2010.

Episode DVDs and a variety of licensed Peppa Pig products including video games and other toys such as playsets, playing cards, vehicles, and stuffed toys are sold. The range was expanded to include household items such as bathroom products, stationery, bed-linen, food, drink, clothing, and jewellery. A music album titled My First Album was released in July 2019.

Video games
There have been several video games based on the property. In 2008, Pinnacle Software signed a deal with Contender Entertainment Group to publish licensed video games based on the property with Asylum Entertainment as developer. The first title: Peppa Pig: The Game was released for the Nintendo DS in November 2008. Following Pinnacle's insolvency in December that year, a successor company - P2 Games, was founded in February 2009, and released a Wii version a year later on 27 November 2009 for the Nintendo Wii, with distribution by Ubisoft It is a children's video game to learn and play, and it contains 11 games and activities.

A second game, Peppa Pig: Fun and Games was released on 22 October 2010 for the Nintendo Wii console and Nintendo DS hand-held game system. Asylum Entertainment and P2 Games remained as developer and publisher for the title.

A third game, My Friend Peppa Pig was developed by Petoons Studio and published by Outright Games. It released on 22 October 2021 for the PlayStation 4, Xbox One, Nintendo Switch, and Windows, exactly 11 years after Peppa Pig: Fun and Games.

Criticism and analysis

Peppa and her family did not wear seat belts in cars in the first two series. After receiving several complaints, Astley Baker Davies announced that all future animation would include characters wearing seat belts, and that the relevant scenes in the first two series would be re-animated to include them. Similar changes were also made to add cycle helmets to early episodes with characters riding bicycles.

Peppa was used to promote the pre-2010 Labour government's Sure Start programme, which had the aim of "giving children the best possible start in life". In April 2010, during the UK General Election campaign, E1 Entertainment said that Peppa would not attend the launch of the Labour Party's families manifesto "in the interests of avoiding any controversy or misunderstanding".

In 2012, the Australian Broadcasting Corporation received a complaint that the Series 1 episode "Mister Skinnylegs" was not appropriate for Australian audiences, as it encouraged befriending spiders; deadly venomous spiders are prevalent in Australia. The complaint was upheld, and the episode was restricted from airing on the ABC network.

In late May 2014, the ABC's Mark Scott expressed fears about the future of Peppa on Australian television, given Australian federal budget cuts to ABC funding that were said to affect its ability to pay for, and broadcast, overseas media products such as Peppa Pig. Australian media noted the character's appeal to Australian toddlers and echoed concerns about the future of her Australian distribution rights. Australian Federal Agriculture Minister Barnaby Joyce made reference to the character as a menu item at a Thai restaurant, while conservative columnist Piers Akerman thought that Peppa "pushes a weird feminist line". On 28 May 2014, Minister for Communications Malcolm Turnbull tweeted: "Contrary to media rumours, Peppa's is one snout we are happy to have in the ABC trough".

In 2015 Norman Lamb, a former UK health minister, said that programmes such as Peppa Pig should include gay characters, because having arbitrary boundaries as to what relationships are acceptable in children's television was "not equitable".

The British Medical Journal carried a light-hearted article in its Christmas 2017 edition, which suggested that although the programme includes numerous "positive public health messages, encouraging healthy eating, exercise, and road safety", it ran the risk of "contributing to unrealistic expectations of primary care" by depicting general practitioner Doctor Brown Bear as making out-of-hours home visits as soon as contacted about apparently trivial illnesses, and dispensing medicines rather too freely. The media company responsible for Peppa Pig offered no comment when contacted about the article by the BBC.

In November 2021, UK Prime Minister Boris Johnson speaking at a Confederation of British Industry conference lost his place in his speech for about 20 seconds and diverted into a lengthy tangent about Peppa Pig, describing the character's shape as a "Picasso-like hairdryer".

"Peppa Pig effect"
Since 2019, it has been observed that children in the US, where Peppa Pig had become an extremely popular programme, had been acquiring some Anglo-English, rather than American pronunciation and vocabulary. For example, tomato and zebra are pronounced in the English, rather than American way; words such as satnav, petrol, mummy and "biscuit" (instead of "cookie") are used; and comments such as "how clever", "Oh dear", and "can I have a go?" picked up. This phenomenon was not an issue for many parents; it trended with the hashtag "#PeppaEffect". Linguistics experts find those conclusions to be "likely exaggerated". A written statement by Entertainment One Ltd. when asked of this phenomenon went on saying: "Young Peppa fans see her as a friend…and, as we do with friends that we admire, pick up some of their characteristics...imitation is the sincerest form of flattery."

Popularity in China
Peppa Pig is popular with mainstream China, and has been featured by official news media such as People's Daily, and even endorsed by People's Liberation Army and Chinese weapons manufacturer Norinco. However, social media posts featuring concerned parents complaining against Peppa Pig have also gone viral. In May 2018, digitally manipulated contents featuring adult content with Peppa Pig were blocked on the video app TikTok, also known as Douyin in China, due to concerns about exposure of adult content to children. According to some media estimates, some 30,000 clips referenced under "#PeppaPig" were removed by the site. The ban was in response to the prevalence of adult content featuring Peppa Pig created by shehuiren (literally "person of society") subculture, which used Peppa Pig as a criminal "mobster" icon, with members of the subculture creating memes and tattoos using imagery from the cartoon, containing adult humor. Original Peppa Pig cartoons remain accessible on all online platforms, including TikTok (Douyin).

Despite the controversy regarding its memes, the series and character remain popular within mainstream Chinese culture, as two Peppa Pig theme parks are set to open in Beijing and Shanghai in 2019. In early 2019, to celebrate the Year of the Pig, the 81-minute animation/live-action film Peppa Pig Celebrates Chinese New Year was released in China. Before the film's release, a five-minute live-action promotional trailer went viral on social media in China, garnering a billion views and being re-posted by numerous state media outlets. The film opened on 6 February 2019, and made US$14 million in the first three days.

Awards and nominations

Awards
 British Academy Children's Awards
 2012, Winner for Best Pre-School Animation
 2011, Winner for Best Pre-School Animation
 2011, Winner for Best Performer (Harley Bird)
 2005, Winner for Best Pre-School Animation series
 Annecy International Animated Film Festival 2005, Winner of the Grand Prize, The Crystal for Best TV Production
 Bradford Animation Film Festival 2005, Winner of Best Children's Animation Series
 Cartoons on the Bay Festival 2005, Winner of Pulcinella Award for Best European Programme of the Year
 Cartoons on the Bay Festival 2005, Winner of Pulcinella Award for Best Pre-School Series
 Cartoons on the Bay Festival 2005, Children's audience award for Best Pre-School series

Nominations
 British Academy Children's Awards
 2013, Nomination for Best Pre-School Animation
 2013, Nomination for Best Writing
 2013, Nomination for Best Multiplatform (Peppa Pig's Holiday game)
 2010, Nomination for Best Pre-School Animation
 2010, Nomination for Best Writing
 2009, Nomination for Best Pre-School Animation
 2009, Nomination for Best Writing
 2008, Nomination for Best Pre-School Animation
 2007, Nomination for Best Pre-School Animation
 2004, Nomination for Best Pre-School Animation

Discography

Studio albums

Singles

Extended plays

References

External links

 
 

Peppa Pig
2000s British animated television series
2010s British animated television series
2020s British animated television series
2000s preschool education television series
2010s preschool education television series
2020s preschool education television series
2004 British television series debuts
Animated preschool education television series
Animation controversies in television
British children's animated comedy television series
British children's animated fantasy television series
British flash animated television series
British preschool education television series
English-language television shows
Nick Jr. original programming
Channel 5 (British TV channel) original programming
Television series by Entertainment One
Animated television series about children
Animated television series about families
Animated television series about pigs
Animated television series about animals
Television controversies in the United Kingdom
Television controversies in the United States
Television shows adapted into novels
Television shows adapted into video games
Internet memes introduced in the 2010s
Film and television memes